This is a list of people who have addressed both Houses of the United Kingdom Parliament at the same time. Although English and later British monarchs have jointly addressed the House of Commons and the House of Lords on several occasions since the 16th century, the first foreign dignitary to do so was French President Albert Lebrun in March 1939. The list excludes the speeches given by (or on behalf of) the Sovereign at the State Opening of Parliament and at the close of each parliamentary session.

Only four people besides the reigning monarch at the time have addressed both Houses together on more than one occasion. Nelson Mandela addressed Members of the Commons and the Lords in 1993 and in 1996 as President of South Africa. Mikhail Gorbachev addressed the Houses as a secretary of the Communist Party of the Soviet Union and a foreign delegate of the Soviet Union in 1984 and again, in 1993, on behalf of the Inter-Parliamentary Union. Shimon Peres addressed the Houses as Prime Minister of Israel in 1986 and as President in 2008. Volodymyr Zelenskyy addressed the Houses as President of Ukraine, the first to address in the Chamber (albeit via remote video link from Ukraine), in 2022 during the war in Ukraine.

People who have addressed both houses of the United Kingdom Parliament

See also 

 Parliament of the United Kingdom
 Joint address (Canada)
 Joint meetings of the Australian Parliament
 Joint session of the United States Congress
 List of joint sessions of the United States Congress

Notes

References

External links 
 United Kingdom Parliament

 People
People who have addressed both Houses of the United Kingdom Parliament
United Kingdom
United Kingdom Parliament, people who have addressed both houses